Moor Hall Meadows is a  biological Site of Special Scientific Interest in Moor Green in Hertfordshire. The local planning authority is East Hertfordshire District Council.

The site has a variety of types of meadows, with marshy grassland being the most extensive. Its rich flora makes it one of the most important grassland sites in the county. There is also a small ancient woodland which has a variety of breeding birds.

There is access by a narrow footpath near Moor Hall.

See also
List of Sites of Special Scientific Interest in Hertfordshire

References

Sites of Special Scientific Interest in Hertfordshire
Meadows in Hertfordshire